Shelby is a city in and the county seat of Toole County, Montana, United States. The population was 3,169 at the 2020 census.

History

Shelby was named in honor of Peter O. Shelby, General Manager of the Montana Central Railway. A railroad station was established here about 1892, at the junction of the Great Northern Railway and the Great Falls & Canada Railway. 

On July 4, 1923, the town hosted a heavyweight boxing match between Jack Dempsey and Tommy Gibbons for the undisputed world Heavyweight boxing championship title. This event almost bankrupted the town of Shelby.

In the early 2000s the town hosted a dog camp named Camp Collie to help mistreated dogs that made national news. 

Welker Farms, an agricultural operation known for its popular social media channels, is located near Shelby, Montana.

The Well Done Foundation, which plugs orphaned and abandoned oil wells, opened a visitors' center in Shelby in 2020.

Geography
Shelby is located at  (48.507270, -111.860218). It is at the intersection of Interstate 15 and U.S. Route 2. It is near the Marias River and also Aloe Lake.

Climate
Shelby has four distinct seasons, and is considered an arid climate.  Long, severe winters give way to springlike weather anywhere from March to May. Summers can be   dry and hot, and the area is prone to   lightning, hail, and severe thunderstorms during the summer months.  Fall weather is often unpredictable, with snow falling during October some years, and temperatures well into the 60s °F (10s °C) stretching until the end of November on other years.  Due to the city's location just off of the Rocky Mountain Front, wind is a constant.

Climate data is sparse.  A weather station operated in the town from the late 1990s shows slightly higher temperatures than nearby towns such as Cut Bank.

Demographics

2010 census
At the 2010 census there were 3,376 people in 1,245 households, including 717 families, in the city. The racial makeup of the city was 89.5% White, 0.8% African American, 6.5% Native American, 0.5% Asian, 0.8% from other races, and 1.9% from two or more races. Hispanic or Latino of any race were 3.0%.

Of the 1,245 households 28.3% had children under the age of 18 living with them, 43.8% were married couples living together, 9.2% had a female householder with no husband present, 4.7% had a male householder with no wife present, and 42.4% were non-families. 37.4% of households were one person and 14% were one person aged 65 or older. The average household size was 2.17 and the average family size was 2.84.

The median age was 40.3 years. 18.9% of residents were under the age of 18; 8.3% were between the ages of 18 and 24; 29.3% were from 25 to 44; 29.9% were from 45 to 64; and 13.6% were 65 or older. The gender makeup of the city was 58.3% male and 41.7% female.

2000 census
At the 2000 census there were 3,216 people in 1,196 households, including 735 families, in the City of Shelby. The population density was 1,018.8 people per square mile (392.9/km). There were 1,349 housing units at an average density of 427.3 per square mile (164.8/km).  The racial makeup of the city was 92.48% White, 0.25% African American, 4.17% Native American, 0.40% Asian, 0.25% from other races, and 2.46% from two or more races. Hispanic or Latino of any race were 1.24%.

Of the 1,196 households 30.9% had children under 18 living with them, 50.8% were married couples living together, 7.5% had a female householder with no husband present, and 38.5% were non-families. 35.5% of households were one person and 16.1% were one person aged 65 or older. The average household size was 2.34 and the average family size was 3.07.

The age distribution was 24.0% under the age of 18, 7.2% from 18 to 24, 29.5% from 25 to 44, 22.9% from 45 to 64, and 16.4% 65 or older. The median age was 39 years. For every 100 females there were 107.4 males. For every 100 females age 18 and over, there were 108.9 males.

The median household income was $29,219 and the median family income  was $41,046. Males had a median income of $27,634 versus $19,444 for females. The per capita income for the city was $15,071. About 6.1% of families and 8.6% of the population were below the poverty line, including 8.8% of those under age 18 and 7.5% of those age 65 or over.

Education
Shelby Public Schools educates students from kindergarten through 12th grade. Shelby High School's team name is the Coyotes.

Toole County Library is a public library in Shelby.

Media
KSEN AM 1150 and KZIN-FM 96.7 are two local radio outlets, owned by Townsquare Media.

Transportation

Amtrak, the national passenger rail system, provides daily service to Shelby (both east and west), operating its Empire Builder from Chicago to Seattle and Portland, Oregon.

Northern Transit Interlocal, local bus transportation system. Provides transportation to Great Falls & Kalispell. 

Shelby Airport is a county-owned airport two miles north of town.

Notable people
James Grady (author), was born and grew up here. He was on the staff of Senator Lee Metcalf, a research columnist for Jack Anderson, author of Six Days of the Condor (filmed as Three Days...) and numerous other spy and crime novels, and writer for Politics Daily. Resident of Washington DC area.
 Jack Horner, paleontologist, was born here.
 Larry Krystkowiak, former NBA player (1986–1996), grew up here. He is the former head men's basketball coach at his alma mater, the University of Montana and former head coach of the NBA's Milwaukee Bucks. He was named the head coach at the University of Utah in March 2011.
Leroy Hood, scientist associated with the Human Genome Project grew up here and graduated from Shelby High School in 1956.

References

External links

 City of Shelby (official site)
 Shelby Area Chamber of Commerce
 Shelby Promoter (weekly newspaper)

Cities in Toole County, Montana
County seats in Montana
Cities in Montana